Regimental Sergeant Major Marc Wicks,  is a former Corps Regimental Sergeant Major of the Royal Marines who went on to serve as Senior Enlisted Advisor to NATO's Allied Command Transformation.

Military career
Wicks was born in Devon and educated at Audley Park Secondary Modern School in Torquay. He joined the Royal Marines in March 1983. He served with 42 Commando in Plymouth. He also served in Norway and qualified as a military ski instructor. In 1984 he deployed to Northern Ireland on Operation Banner, and in 1988 he volunteered to return to Northern Ireland for Operation Internet.

Wicks completed a physical training instructor first class course, qualifying at the top of his class. In 1998 he became the physical training advisor at the United States Marine Corps Officer Candidate School in Quantico, Virginia. While there he was awarded the Navy and Marine Corps Commendation Medal.

After passing the Regimental Sergeant Major's Board, Wicks was appointed as the Regimental Sergeant Major of 42 Commando in March 2005. He completed numerous exercises, deployed to Norway and served in Afghanistan on Operation Herrick 5. On his return from operations he was assigned as the Regimental Sergeant Major of Command Support Training, where he was responsible for the training of all future warrant officers in the Royal Marines. Wicks was awarded the Meritorious Service Medal in 2008.

Wicks was then selected to serve as the Corps Regimental Sergeant Major until June 2011, when he assumed his position at NATO. Wicks took over the role as Allied Command Transformation senior enlisted leader from Command Sergeant Major Ludek Kolesa, from the Czech Republic who held the post from 2007 to 2011, after selection from candidates from all NATO countries.

References

|-

Royal Marines ranks
Royal Navy personnel of the War in Afghanistan (2001–2021)
British military personnel of The Troubles (Northern Ireland)
Year of birth missing (living people)
Living people